Dubautia imbricata is a rare species of flowering plant in the family Asteraceae known by the common names bog dubautia and imbricate dubautia. It is endemic to Hawaii where it is known only from the island of Kauai. There are four known occurrences. Like other Dubautia this plant is known as na`ena`e.

This member of the silversword alliance was first described to science in 1981 after it was discovered in a Kauaian rainforest. It grows in just a few spots in boggy forest habitat in the understory of ʻōhiʻa lehua (Metrosideros polymorpha) trees among sedges in the genera Oreobolus and Rhynchospora.

There are two subspecies. Both are rare and ssp. imbricata was federally listed as an endangered species of the United States in 2010.

The inflorescence is a cluster of many flower heads, each of which contains several yellow flowers.

Both subspecies are known to hybridize with other Dubautia.

References

External links
USDA Plants Profile for Dubautia imbricata

imbricata
Endemic flora of Hawaii
Biota of Kauai
Plants described in 1981